The Finnish national road 1 ( or) is the main route between the major cities of Helsinki and Turku in southern Finland. It runs from Munkkiniemi in Helsinki to the VI District of Turku, and is part of the European route E18. The road is a motorway for its whole length.

The first portion of the motorway was constructed in the 1960s between central Helsinki and Kehä III, and extended to Lohjanharju in the 1970s. In the other end of the road, the motorway stretches from eastern Turku to Lahnajärvi near Suomusjärvi. In 2005, a portion of motorway between Lohjanharju and Lohja was opened. The last part of the motorway (Lahnajärvi–Lohjanharju) was opened on January 28, 2009. This part of motorway contains five tunnels totalling . The longest tunnel (double-bore) is also the second longest road tunnel in Finland.

Route 

The road passes through the following localities:
Helsinki
Espoo
Kirkkonummi (Veikkola)
Vihti
Lohja 
Salo
Paimio
Kaarina
Turku

See also 
 Highways in Finland
 Turuntie
 Åland Islands Highway 1

External links

 Finnish national road 1 at the Finnish Road Administration.

Roads in Finland